The 2016 Coastal Carolina Chanticleers football team represented Coastal Carolina University in the 2016 NCAA Division I FCS football season. They were led by fifth-year head coach Joe Moglia and played their home games at Brooks Stadium. They were in their first and only season as an FCS Independent. The Chanticleers joined the FBS Sun Belt Conference in July 2016 as a full but non-football member. The football team will transition to FBS, joining Sun Belt football in 2017 and gaining full FBS membership and bowl eligibility in 2018.  They finished the season .

Schedule

Game summaries

at Lamar

Florida A&M

at Jacksonville State

Furman

Charleston Southern

at Gardner–Webb

Central Connecticut

at Presbyterian

Monmouth

Bryant

Liberty

Hampton

Ranking movements

* Due to their transition to FBS, they are not eligible to be ranked in the FCS Coaches Poll.

References

Coastal Carolina
Coastal Carolina Chanticleers football seasons
Coastal Carolina Chanticleers football